Jean Cedrik Gbo (born 9 September 2002) is an Ivorian footballer who currently plays as a midfielder for Espérance de Tunis.

Career statistics

Club

Notes

References

External links

2002 births
Living people
Ivorian footballers
Ivorian expatriate footballers
Association football midfielders
Belgian Pro League players
Espérance Sportive de Tunis players
Oud-Heverlee Leuven players
Ivorian expatriate sportspeople in Tunisia
Expatriate footballers in Tunisia
Ivorian expatriate sportspeople in Belgium
Expatriate footballers in Belgium